The 1999–00 UC Irvine Anteaters men's basketball team represented the University of California, Irvine during the 1999–00 NCAA Division I men's basketball season. The Anteaters were led by 3rd year head coach Pat Douglass and played at the Bren Events Center and were members of the Big West Conference.

Previous season 
The 1998–99 UC Irvine Anteaters men's basketball team finished the season with a record of 6–20 and 2–14 in Big West play. Freshman guard Jerry Green won the conference freshman of the year award.

Roster

Schedule

|-
!colspan=9 style=|Non-Conference Season

|-
!colspan=9 style=|Conference Season

|-
!colspan=9 style=| Big West Conference tournament

Source

Awards and honors
Jerry Green
All-Big West Second Team
Greg Ethington
Big West All-Freshman Team

Source:

References

UC Irvine Anteaters men's basketball seasons
UC Irvine
UC Irvine Anteaters
UC Irvine Anteaters